American rock band Enuff Z'Nuff currently has 17 studio albums, 5 live albums, and 4 compilations for a total of 27 official albums. Their highest charting singles were "Fly High Michelle" and "New Thing" from their 1989 self-titled release. Enuff Z'Nuff's latest studio release of new material, named Brainwashed Generation, was released in July 2020. A 3-disc compilation of unreleased material, Never Enuff, was released by Cleopatra Records in August 2021. A Beatles' Tribute Album named "Hardrock Nite" came out in 2021. Their newest release, Finer than Sin, will come out November 11, 2022 through Frontiers Records. It will be the 4th consecutive album with Chip Z'nuff taking over lead vocals.

Discography

Studio albums

Live albums
Live (1998)
One More for the Road (2005)
Extended Versions (2006)
Tonight, Sold Out (2008)
Live and Peace 2009: 20th Anniversary Live at Club Citta (2009, Japan only)

Compilation albums
Favorites (2003)
Greatest Hits (2006)
Covered in Gold (2014)
Never Enuff: Rarities & Demos (2021)

Video albums
Enuff Z'Nuff (VHS) (1990)
Official Bootleg 1989-1997 (VHS) (1997)
Favorites: Suck It & See (DVD) (2004 - UK Only)

Singles
"New Thing" (1989) (U.S. Hot 100 #67, U.S. Mainstream Rock #35)
"Fly High Michelle" (1990) (U.S. Hot 100 #47, U.S. Mainstream Rock #27)
"Mother's Eyes" (1991) (U.S. Mainstream Rock #17)
"Baby Loves You" (1991)
"Right by Your Side" (1993)
"Innocence" (1993)  (no music video supported this single)
"You Got a Hold of Me" (1994)
"Bullet from a Gun" (1995)
"Life Is Strange" (1996)
"Wheels" (1997)
"Freak" (1999)
"There Goes My Heart" (2000)
"The Stroke" (2014)
"Dog on a Bone" (2016)
"Diamond Boy" (2018)
"Where Did You Go" (2019)
"Broken Love" (2021)
"Catastrophe" (2022)

Soundtrack appearances
Henry: Portrait of a Serial Killer (1990) - "Fingers on It"
Northern Exposure (1992) - "I Could Never Be Without You"
Beverly Hills 90210 (1992) - "Hot Little Summer Girl"
Jerry Maguire (1996) - "Bring It On Home"
Dead Awake (2001) - "Wake Up"
The Promotion (2008) - "There Goes My Heart"
Dahmer vs. Gacy (2010) - "Roll Me", "Can't Wait", "You & I", "Z Overture", "Rock N World", "Wheels", "Everything Works If You Let It"
Peacemaker (2022) - "New Thing"

Other song appearances
Webster Hall: Rock N Roll (1998) - "Runaway (Demo)"
Fire Woman: A Tribute to the Cult (2001) - "She Sells Sanctuary"
A Tribute to Vai/Satriani: Lords of Karma (2002) - "Yankee Rose"
Labour of Love: A Tribute to Life (2006) - "Outerspace"

Related projects

Songs covered by other artists
 Sy Klopps Blues Band (1993) - Walter Ego - "Round and Round"
 The Tuesday Girls (1994) - When You're a Tuesday Girl - "Right By Your Side"
 James Young Group (1995) - Raised by Wolves - "Faith, Love and Hope"
 James Young Group (1995) - Raised by Wolves - "Amazing Grace"
 Nelson (1996) - Imaginator - "We're All Alright"
 The Wildhearts (1997) - "Anthem" (single) - "Time to Let You Go"
 Paul Gilbert (1998) - Flying Dog - "Girl Crazy"
 The Tuesdays (1998) - The Tuesdays - "Wheels"
 Lana Lane (2002) - Covers Collection - "Innocence"
 Richie Scarlet (2002) - The Insanity of Life - "Fly High Michelle"
 Paul Gilbert (2003) - Gilbert Hotel - "Time to Let You Go (Live)"
 Various Artists (2003) - A Tribute to Enuff Z'Nuff - 15 songs covered by 15 artists
 Malik Yusef (2009) - G.O.O.D. Morning, G.O.O.D. Night - "By Your Side"

Related music releases
 Needle Park - C'mon Get Real  (2002)Donnie Vie lead vocals on "When It All Comes Around" and "Take Me Back"
 Donnie Vie - Just Enough! - (2003)first Donnie Vie solo album, sometimes under the name Don E. Vie
 Various Artists - Influences & Connections: A Tribute to Mr. Big (2003)Donnie Vie lead vocals on "Green Tinted Sixties Mind"
 Don E. Vie - This & That (2004)limited release CD features Enuff Z'Nuff demos along with new solo material
 Drama Queen Die - Drama Queen Die (2004)Chip Z'Nuff and Ricky Parent play bass and drums on the full album
 Donnie Vie - DVieD-EP (2006)includes 5 song demo EP and history spanning DVD
 Donnie Vie - Extra Strength (2007)re-recordings of the Enuff Z'Nuff Strength album, mainly performed acoustically
 Various Artists - Sugar Boxx Soundtrack (2010)features the Johnnie Rotten Jr. songs "Yesterday" and "F*Marry*Kill"
 Adler's Appetite - "Alive", "Stardog", "Fading" (2010)Chip Z'Nuff is the bassist on these singles
 Johnnie Rotten Jr. - The Death of Harry Potter - (2010)Chip Z'Nuff solo album
 Johnny Monaco - "I Used to Be in Enuff Z'Nuff" (single) (2010)instrumental by Monaco with interview footage of Chip Z'Nuff sampled
 Liberty N' Justice - Chasing a Cure (2010)Donnie Vie lead vocals on "Throwing Stones"
 Donnie Vie - Wrapped Around My Middle Finger (2012)second full-length Donnie Vie solo album
 Liberty N' Justice - The Cigar Chronicles (2012)Donnie Vie lead vocals on "Madhatter"
 Primitive Overflow - Honor Way Down (2012)Donnie Vie lead vocals on all songs
 Magic Eight Ball - Sorry We're Late But We're Worth the Wait (2013)Donnie Vie additional vocals on "Before It Was Murder (You Got Me Talking)"
 Adler Z'Nuff - S/T (2014)5-track digital EP with Chip Z'Nuff and Steven Adler
 Donnie Vie - The White Album (2014)third full-length Donnie Vie solo album
 Chip Z'Nuff - Strange Time (2015)first full-length Chip Z'Nuff solo album
 E-Z-N - Trouble Maker (Single) (2018)features former members Donnie Vie, Johnny Monaco, and Eric Donner
 Donnie Vie - Beautiful Things (2019)fourth full-length Donnie Vie solo album
 Donnie Vie - Party Time (Single) (2021)features Chip Z'Nuff on bass
 Chip Z'Nuff - Perfectly Imperfect (2022)Second full-length Chip Z'Nuff solo album

Filmography
 Sugar Boxx (2010) - Chip Z'Nuff as "Rybarski"
 Nowhere Fast: The Forgotten Story of Approach Control (cancelled) - Donnie Vie as "Donny"

References

External links
Enuff Z'Nuff official website
Enuff Z'Nuff Myspace
Donnie Vie official website

Discographies of American artists
Rock music group discographies

es:Enuff Z'Nuff
fr:Enuff Z'Nuff
id:Enuff Z'Nuff
it:Enuff Z'Nuff
ja:イナフ・ズナフ
pt:Enuff Z'Nuff